Eslamabad-e Shadeh (also Romanized as Eslāmābād-e Shādeh; also known as Eslāmābād) is a village in Sadan Rostaq-e Sharqi Rural District, in the Central District of Kordkuy County, Golestan Province, Iran. At the 2006 census, its population was 1250, in 387 families.

References 

Populated places in Kordkuy County